Michał Cwynar DFC was a Polish fighter ace of the Polish Air Force in World War II with 5 confirmed kills and one shared.

Biography
Michał Cwynar, born in 1915 was the son of Jan and Maria. In 1933 he entered the Air Force Non-Commissioned Officer's School for minors in Bydgoszcz. After he completed his fighter pilot training in 1937 he was assigned to the Polish 114th Fighter Escadrille where he flew PZL P.11. On 6 December 1938 he was posted to the Polish 113th Fighter Escadrille.

On the first day of World War II Cwynar shot down a Ju 87. On 17 September 1939 he crossed the border with Romania. On 29 October 1939 he arrived to France via Beirut. After a training on Caudron C.714 and MS-406 he took part in the Battle of France where he flew MS-406 and later Dewoitine D.520. On 19 June 1940 he flew to Algiers and finally via Casablanca and Gibraltar he came in the UK on 17 July 1940.

Initially Cwynar was sent to the 15 EFTS in Carlisle then to the  No 10 Bombing and Gunnery School in Dumries. On 15 April 1941 he was ordered to the No. 315 Polish Fighter Squadron. On 14 August 1941 he shot down a Bf 109, on 16 September another one. On 1 June 1942 he was promoted second lieutenant (podporucznik). On 3 February 1943 he scored a Fw 190 near Calais.  From 5 May 1943 he was an instructor with No. 58 Operation Training Unit in Balado Bridge. He returned to his squadron on 20 November 1943. On 3 July 1945 he was given command No. 316 Polish Fighter Squadron.

Michał Cwynar was demobilized in 1948, settled in Dumfries and founded his own company: "EMSEE Upholsterers & Coach Trimmers". He died on 26 May 2008.

Aerial victory credits
 Ju 87 – 1 September 1939
 Bf 110 – 3 September 1939 (probably)
 Bf 109 – 14 August 1941
 Bf 109 – 16 September 1941
 Fw 190 – 3 February 1943
 Bf 109 – 30 July 1944
 1/2 Bf 109 – 30 July 1944 (shared with second lieutenant Gwidon Świstuń)

Awards
 Virtuti Militari, Silver Cross 
 Cross of Valour (Poland), four times
 Distinguished Flying Cross (United Kingdom)
 Silver Cross of Merit with Swords

References

Bibliography
 Bartłomiej Belcarz: Grupa Myśliwska Montpellier 1940. Sandomierz: Wydawnictwo Stratus, 2012  
 Tadeusz Jerzy Krzystek, Anna Krzystek: Polskie Siły Powietrzne w Wielkiej Brytanii w latach 1940-1947 łącznie z Pomocniczą Lotniczą Służbą Kobiet (PLSK-WAAF). Sandomierz: Stratus, 2012, s. 137. 
 Jerzy Pawlak: Polskie eskadry w Wojnie Obronnej 1939. Warszawa: Wydawnictwa Komunikacji i Łączności, 1991 
 Jerzy Pawlak: Absolwenci Szkoły Orląt: 1925-1939. Warszawa: Retro-Art, 2009, s. 299. 
 Piotr Sikora: Asy polskiego lotnictwa. Warszawa: Oficyna Wydawnicza Alma-Press. 2014, s. 329-332. 
 Józef Zieliński: Asy polskiego lotnictwa. Warszawa: Agencja lotnicza ALTAIR, 1994, s. 61. ISBN 83862172.

Further reading

External links
 

Polish World War II flying aces
Recipients of the Silver Cross of the Virtuti Militari
Recipients of the Cross of Valour (Poland)
2008 deaths
1915 births